The Road to Reality: A Complete Guide to the Laws of the Universe is a book on modern physics by the British mathematical physicist Roger Penrose, published in 2004. It covers the basics of the Standard Model of particle physics, discussing general relativity and quantum mechanics, and discusses the possible unification of these two theories.

Overview
The book discusses the physical world. Many fields that 19th century scientists believed were separate, such as electricity and magnetism, are aspects of more fundamental properties. Some texts, both popular and university level, introduce these topics as separate concepts, and then reveal their combination much later. The Road to Reality reverses this process, first expounding the underlying mathematics of space–time, then showing how electromagnetism and other phenomena fall out fully formed.

The book is just over 1100 pages, of which the first 383 are dedicated to mathematics—Penrose's goal is to acquaint inquisitive readers with the mathematical tools needed to understand the remainder of the book in depth. Physics enters the discussion on page 383 with the topic of spacetime. From there it moves on to fields in spacetime, deriving the classical electrical and magnetic forces from first principles; that is, if one lives in spacetime of a particular sort, these fields develop naturally as a consequence. Energy and conservation laws appear in the discussion of Lagrangians and Hamiltonians, before moving on to a full discussion of quantum physics, particle theory and quantum field theory. A discussion of the measurement problem in quantum mechanics is given a full chapter; superstrings are given a chapter near the end of the book, as are loop gravity and twistor theory.  The book ends with an exploration of other theories and possible ways forward.

The final chapters reflect Penrose's personal perspective, which differs in some respects from what he regards as the current fashion among theoretical physicists. He is skeptical about string theory, to which he prefers loop quantum gravity. He is optimistic about his own approach, twistor theory. He also holds some controversial views about the role of consciousness in physics, as laid out in his earlier books (see Shadows of the Mind).

Reception
According to Brian Blank:

According to Nicholas Lezard:

According to Lee Smolin:

According to Frank Wilczek:

Editions
Jonathan Cape (1st edition), 2004, hardcover, 
Alfred A. Knopf (publisher), February 2005, hardcover, 
Vintage Books, 2005, softcover, 
Vintage Books, 2006, softcover,  
Vintage Books, 2007, softcover,

References

External links
 Site with errata and solutions to some exercises from the first few chapters. Not sponsored by Penrose.
 Archive of the Road to Reality internet forum, now defunct.
 Solutions for many Road to Reality exercises.

2004 non-fiction books
Alfred A. Knopf books
Cosmology books
Mathematics books
Popular physics books
Quantum mind
String theory books
Works by Roger Penrose